Mark Jacoby (born May 21, 1947) is an American musical theatre performer.  He has achieved fame from his leading roles on Broadway in Show Boat, The Phantom of the Opera and Ragtime, among others.  He has also performed widely in national tours, regional theatre and Off-Broadway.

Career
On Broadway, Jacoby appeared in the revival of Sweet Charity from 1986 to 1987. He portrayed the Phantom in The Phantom of the Opera from 1991 to 1993. Jacoby later appeared in the revivals of Grand Hotel, Show Boat, Man of La Mancha, and Sweeney Todd. For his role in Show Boat, he was nominated for a Tony Award in 1994. Jacoby acted in the original productions of Elf: The Musical and Ragtime and portrayed Wizard of Oz in the touring production of Wicked.

Jacoby has appeared in episodes of Law & Order, As the World Turns, The Blacklist, and others. Jacoby portrayed Supreme Court Chief Justice Warren Burger in the 2017 film The Post and Hershel Jick in the 2021 miniseries Dopesick.

Filmography

Film

Television

References

External links
 
 
 
 Official The Phantom of the Opera site, List of past Phantoms

1947 births
Living people
American male musical theatre actors
People from Johnson City, Tennessee